Raoul André  (24 May 1916 in Rabat (Morocco) - 4 November 1992) was a French director and screenwriter, He was married to actress Louise Carletti (December 1955), and he is the father of Ariane Carletti.

Filmography 

 The Village of Wrath (1947)
Cab Number 13 (1948)
L'Assassin est à l'écoute (1948)
 Good Enough to Eat (1951)
Une nuit à Megève (1953)
Les Clandestines (1954)
Marchandes d'illusions (1954)
Une fille épatante (1955)
The Babes Make the Law (1955)
Cherchez la femme (1955)
Les Indiscrètes (1956)
 The Babes in the Secret Service (1956)
 (1956)
La Polka des menottes (1957)
Clara et les Méchants (1958)
Les Fruits du péché (1959)
La Planque (1961)
Jeff Gordon, Secret Agent (1963)
Les Femmes d'abord (1963)
Ces dames s'en mêlent (1964)
Mission to Caracas (1965)
 (1967)
 (1967)
 (1969)
Le Bourgeois gentil mec (1969)
La dernière bourrée à Paris (1973)
Y'a un os dans la moulinette (1974)

References

External links
 Raoul André at the Internet Movie Database

French film directors
French male screenwriters
20th-century French screenwriters
Writers from Rabat
1916 births
1992 deaths
20th-century French male writers
French expatriates in Morocco